The Millennium Forum is a theatre and conference centre in Newmarket Street, Derry, Northern Ireland.

It was the first purpose-built theatre in Derry and opened in 2001. It has a seating capacity of 1,000 and the largest theatre stage in Ireland. It hosts entertainment of all kinds and can also be used as a meeting and conference venue.

References

External links

360 Degree Tour

Theatres in Derry (city)